Champion, in comics, may refer to:

Champion of the Universe, a Marvel Comics character and a member of The Elders
The Champion (comics), a British comic
Champion, two DC Comics characters, the second of which was an alias used by Hercules

It may also refer to:
Champions (1975 team), a Marvel Comics superhero team that debuted in 1975
Champions (2016 team), a Marvel Comics superhero team that debuted in 2016
Imus Champion, an enemy of Hawkeye, the Avengers and Squadron Supreme
Christopher Champion, Martin's son who went by the alias Tempest

See also
Champion (disambiguation)